Bassem Feghali is a Lebanese comedian, singer and drag queen.

Career
Bassem graduated from "Studio el fan" in 1996 winning a gold medal. He has performed at many shows, festivals and television programs since then. A standard part of his act is to sing comic versions of popular songs while dressed with elaborate wigs, costumes and cosmetics and imitating the manners of the singer who made the song popular originally—usually a female singer. He can sing in a high-pitch voice. His act also includes other kinds of costume comedy.

Bassem Feghali started his comedy career by impersonating the famous singer Sabah. He then went on to impersonations and mimicry of many other Lebanese and world celebrities, primarily singers, such as Nawal Al Zoughbi, Haifa Wehbe, Fairouz, Shakira, Marilyn Monroe, Lady Gaga, Britney Spears, Marwa, Nancy Ajram, Elissa, and Mariam Nour.  He has also impersonated historical figures such as Ivette Sursok, Maggi Farah and Miss Lebanon pageant contestants, such as Lamita Franjieh.

Bassem Feghali is known for his ability to imitate the voices of personalities he impersonates without lip synching. When imitating female singers, he has to diet and exercise his voice so that he could impersonate the idols well. During the month of Ramadan, Bassem had a daily show on the Lebanese Broadcasting Corporation (LBC). The show was called "Alf Wayle Bi Layle". He imitated a different Arab artist each day for the full month. Some people he imitated were Sabah, Nawal Al Zoghbi, Fifi Abdo, Assala, Majida El Roumi, etc.

Awards
He was a laureate of the "Murex d'Or" awards in 2000 as Best Monologist of the Year.

References

External links
 Official Site Biography

Living people
Drag queens
1978 births